Sirik (also Romanized as Sandarak, Sanderk, Sendaraic, and Sendarak; also known as Senderg and Sindrik) is a city and capital of Senderk District, in Minab County, Hormozgan Province, Iran.

References 

Populated places in Minab County
Cities in Hormozgan Province